Therese Muldowney (born 1987) is a camogie player and social worker, who played in the 2009 All Ireland camogie final. Therese has won Under-16 and Minor provincial titles with Kilkenny as well as a schools All- Ireland in the Senior 'B' grade. Her brother, Ciarán, is a well-known trainer and club player with Conahy Shamrocks, and she made her senior debut in 2009.

References

External links 
 Official Camogie Website
 Kilkenny Camogie Website
 of 2009 championship in On The Ball Official Camogie Magazine
 https://web.archive.org/web/20091228032101/http://www.rte.ie/sport/gaa/championship/gaa_fixtures_camogie_oduffycup.html Fixtures and results] for the 2009 O'Duffy Cup
 All-Ireland Senior Camogie Championship: Roll of Honour
 Video highlights of 2009 championship Part One and part two
 Video Highlights of 2009 All Ireland Senior Final
 Report of All Ireland final in Irish Times Independent and Examiner

1987 births
Living people
Kilkenny camogie players
UCC camogie players